Music of Georgia may refer to:

 Music of Georgia (country)
 Music of Georgia (U.S. state)